The Polish Officer (1995) is a novel by Alan Furst.

Plot summary
In September 1939, as Warsaw falls to the Wehrmacht, Captain Alexander de Milja is recruited to Poland's newly formed underground army, the Związek Walki Zbrojnej (ZWZ), or the Union of Armed Struggle. His first mission is to smuggle the national gold reserves out of the country by means of a refugee train to Bucharest. Under a series of aliases, De Milja undertakes various missions to sabotage German operations. These see him collude with fellow saboteurs in the back alleys and black-market bistros of Paris, working with the underground in the tenements of Warsaw, assisting the British attack on German naval targets in the harbor of Calais, and teaming with partisan guerrillas in the frozen forests of the Ukraine.

Characters
Alexander de Milja is a young army officer. His family belongs to the Polish aristocracy, and he is a graduate of the elite French military school Saint-Cyr. Working as a cartographer in the Polish military before the fall of Poland, De Milja is then recruited to the underground, where his exploits see him assume various aliases; he passes at any one time as a Russian writer, a Slovak coal merchant, or a Polish horse breeder. 

Anton Vyborg is De Milja's superior in the armed forces and a key source of help. He also appears in The Spies of Warsaw and Dark Star.

Genya Beilis is De Milja's main love interest in the novel.

Themes

Reviews

Novels by Alan Furst
1995 novels
American spy novels
American historical novels
Novels set during World War II
Novels set in Paris
Fiction set in 1939